novanation was a DAB+ and an internet 24/7 dance music radio station, but no longer broadcasts on either medium.

It was marketed as Australia's first 'digital' dance station in an effort to differentiate itself from analogue stations such as Kiss 90FM, Wild FM and Fresh 92.7, which were established in 1994, 1996 and 1998 respectively. Fresh 92.7 secured a permanent community licence in 2002. While Kiss 90 missed out on a permanent community licence, some of the Kiss 90 team evolved the concept and created Kiss FM Australia in 2005. Kiss FM Australia is now operating on several low power narrowcast licences across Melbourne and in some regional areas through Orbit FM.

novanation is no longer available on DAB+. Early in 2013 it was removed in Adelaide and Perth and replaced by a DAB+ syndication of smoothfm.  It was removed in Sydney, Melbourne and Brisbane as at 24 December 2013 and replaced by Coles Radio, which is fronted by Coles Supermarkets. The station was accessible anywhere online until mid 2016, when it ceased streaming. The Novanation name lives on as a weekend offering on the NovaFM stations.

References

Nova Entertainment
Dance radio stations
Radio stations established in 2009
Radio stations disestablished in 2016
Radio stations in Sydney
Radio stations in Melbourne
Radio stations in Brisbane
Radio stations in Adelaide
Radio stations in Perth, Western Australia
Digital-only radio stations
Digital radio in Australia
Internet radio stations in Australia
Defunct radio stations in Australia